The 2014 SEABA Under-18 Championship was the qualifying tournament for Southeast Asia Basketball Association at the 2014 FIBA Asia Under-18 Championship. The tournament was the ninth edition and was held in Tawau, in Sabah, Malaysia from May 5 to 7. The top two teams represented SEABA in the 2014 FIBA Asia Under-18 Championship.

After the single round-robin elimination, the Philippines won its seventh title overall in the tournament, and its fourth consecutive title since 2008. Malaysia finished second to qualify for the 2014 FIBA Asia Under-18 Championship.

Round robin

Final standings

Awards

References

SEABA Under-18 Championship
International basketball competitions hosted by Malaysia
2013–14 in Asian basketball
2013–14 in Philippine basketball
2013–14 in Malaysian basketball
2013–14 in Indonesian basketball
2013–14 in Singaporean basketball